Cecily Polson, is a New Zealand-born former Australian actress, known for her role as Martha O'Dare in the television series E Street in which she appeared for its four-year run from the pilot in 1989 to 1993, appearing in 403 episodes.  
 
She has primarily appeared in television soap opera as a character actress including Certain Women, Cop Shop, Ryan, Homicide (5 roles), Division 4 (8 roles), A Country Practice (3 roles), G.P., The Flying Doctors and All Saints (5 roles).  
 
Her film roles dating from 1969 onwards include both theatrical and TV movies The Year of Living Dangerously and Muriel's Wedding. She also appeared in the horror genre films See No Evil and See No Evil 2.
  
She was married to fellow New Zealand-born Australian actor Peter Gwynne.

Filmography

References

External links

Australian film actresses
Australian television actresses
Living people
Year of birth missing (living people)
Place of birth missing (living people)